Nijūyon-Ken Station (二十四軒駅) is a Sapporo Municipal Subway station in Nishi-ku, Sapporo, Hokkaido, Japan. The station number is T04.

Platforms

Surrounding area
 Sapporo Racecourse
 Sapporo Central wholesale Market
 Nijuyonken Park
 Sapporo City Transportation Bureau, Subway West Depot
 Sapporo Physical rehabilitation Center
 JR Hokkaido Bus, Kotoni Office and Terminal
 Nijuyonken Police station
 Nijuyonken Post Office
 Sapporo City Agricultural Cooperative Association (JA Sapporo), Head Office
 Ajinomoto Hokkaido
 Isuzu Hokkaido
 Sharp Sapporo building
 Yamada Denki Sapporo Kotoni store
 Descente sportswear store, Sapporo branch
 Royal Host, Miyanomori shop
 AOKI, Nijuyonken store Sapporo
 UNIQLO store Sapporo Nijuyonken
 Apamanshop Sapporo Nijuyonken
 SSP Co., Ltd (pharmaceutical), Hokkaido Branch Office
 NETZ Toyota, Head office and central store
 Toppan Printing, Sapporo Office
 House Foods, Sapporo branch
 Sato Fisheries, Head Office and factory shop Nijuyonken
 Nijuyonken Kotoni store, CO-OP Sapporo
 Sazae-San food Headquarters Office
 Bell Food, Head Office and factory
 Hokkaido shinkin Bank Kotoni branch
 Hokkaido Bank, Central Market branch

External links

 Sapporo Subway Stations

Railway stations in Japan opened in 1976
Railway stations in Sapporo
Sapporo Municipal Subway